An individual sport is a sport in which participants compete as individuals. However, team competitions within individual sports also occur, such as the Davis Cup and the Fed Cup.

Overview

Examples

Athletics
Badminton
Billiards
Bodybuilding
Boxing
Bowling
Bowls
Calisthenics
Canoeing
Caving
Chess
Croquet
Crossfit
Cycling
Dance
Darts
Disc golf
Diving
Equestrian
Fencing
Figure skating
Golf
Gymnastics
Knife throwing
Martial arts
Mixed martial arts
Orienteering
Pool
Powerlifting
Racquetball
Rock climbing
Rowing
Running
Sailing
Sapakan
Shooting
Skateboarding
Skiing
Skimboarding
Skipping rope
Snowboarding
Snooker
Speed skating
Sport stacking
Squash
Surfing
Swimming
T'ai chi ch'uan
Table football
Table tennis
Taekwondo
Ten-pin bowling
Tennis
Track and field
Triathlon
Wife-carrying
Wrestling

See also
 Team sport

References

External links
Team camaraderie dominates individual sport
Team or Individual Sports? Detailed argument in favour of individual sports